Otto H. Königsberger (13 October 1908 – 3 January 1999) was a German architect who worked mainly in urban development planning in Africa, Asia and Latin America, with the United Nations.

Early life
Königsberger was born in Berlin in 1908, and trained as an architect there at the Technical University of Berlin, graduating in 1931. In 1933, he won the Schinkel Prize for Architecture for a design for the Olympic Stadium in Berlin. However, with the rise to power of the Nazi Party, Königsberger was forced to leave the country, as was his uncle, physicist Max Born. Königsberger later illustrated Born's popularized physics text, The Restless Universe (published 1935).
 
Königsberger spent the next six years in the Swiss Institute for the History of Egyptian Architecture in Cairo, where he gained his doctorate. When his uncle Max Born was in Bangalore as a guest of  Raman, the Diwan Mirza Ismail enquired if he know of any trained architect. Thanks to Born's introduction, Königsberger was appointed chief architect and planner to Mysore State, India in 1939. His buildings during this period include some buildings in the Indian Institute of Science (1943–44), the Tata Institute of Fundamental Research (TIFR) in Bombay (Mumbai), the bus station, Serum Institute and Victory Hall (1946, renamed as Town Hall) in Bangalore, the town plan for Bhubaneswar, and some town planning for Jamshedpur with the vision of  Tata. After Indian Independence he became director of housing for the Indian Ministry of Health from 1948 to 1951, working on resettling those displaced by partition.

Career
In 1953 Königsberger moved to London and became head of the Department of Development and Tropical Studies at the Architectural Association, which later became the Development Planning Unit of University College, London, where he worked as a professor until his retirement in 1978.

Königsberger taught that town planners in the developing world should be prepared to dynamically adapt their plans, and involve local communities and techniques, as opposed to imposing a static master plan based on Western ideas – an approach he called Action Planning. He served as a senior adviser to the United Nations Economic and Social Council from the 1950s, and helped launch Habitat International in 1976, which he edited until 1978. His Manual of tropical housing and building was published in several languages and remains a standard course text in many parts of the world.

Awards and legacy
In 1989, Königsberger was one of the first recipients of the UN Habitat Scroll of Honour, the most prestigious award given by the United Nations in recognition of work carried out in the field of human settlements development. The same year, University College London established the Otto Koenigsberger Scholarship to enable young professionals from developing countries to study urban planning in the UK.

See also
Mahoney tables

Bibliography

References

1908 births
1999 deaths
German urban planners
Jewish emigrants from Nazi Germany to the United Kingdom
Architects from Berlin
Academics of University College London
20th-century German architects